The 2010 Haarlem Baseball Week was an international baseball competition held at the Pim Mulier Stadium in Haarlem, the Netherlands from July 9–18, 2010. It was the 25th edition of the tournament.

On July 17, the Netherlands won the tournament for the third time, by winning after 10 innings against Japan.

Teams
Originally, Venezuela would appear for the first time at the Baseball Week, but due to problems getting visa for Puerto Rico, where the 2010 Central American and Caribbean Games were set to be held, the organization of the tournament had to withdraw the team.

 
 Chinese Taipei is the official IBAF designation for the team representing the state officially referred to as the Republic of China, more commonly known as Taiwan. (See also political status of Taiwan for details.)
 Japan was represented by an all-star team of the Keiji University Baseball League.
 The United States were represented by an all-star team of the National Junior College Athletic Association.

Schedule and results
The schedule was changed three times due to the problems with the team from Venezuela. The organization of the tournament decided on July 10 to cancel the final round. The teams met each other two times and the winner was decided by win-loss record.

Standings

Schedule

Final standings

Tournament awards

External links
Official Website

References

Haarlem Baseball Week